Kurozwęki  is a village in the district of Gmina Staszów, within Staszów County, Świętokrzyskie Voivodeship, in south-central Poland.

The village's history dates back to the 13th century. It had city rights from before 1400 to 1870. It has several tourist attractions, including a 14th-century palace, open for visitors, with a bison farm nearby, and a 15th-century church. The village has a population of  767.

Some time in the mid 14th century, local knight Dobiesław of Kurozwęki built here a castle, which became the seat of the Kurozwęcki noble family (see szlachta). At first the castle was of defensive character, but in the course of the time it was remodeled several times. It is not known when exactly Kurozwęki received town charter, most probably it happened before the year 1400. The town belonged to several families – the Kurozwęcki, the Lanckoroński, the Potocki and the Popiel. In the 17th century, when Kurozwęki belonged to Lesser Poland's Sandomierz Voivodeship, it was one of the centers of Protestant Reformation, especially Calvinism. In 1870, the government of Russian-controlled Congress Poland (see Partitions of Poland) deprived it of the town charter.

Demography 
According to the 2002 Poland census, there were 844 people residing in Kurozwęki village, of whom 44.5% were male and 55.5% were female. In the village, the population was spread out, with 15.9% under the age of 18, 28.6% from 18 to 44, 24.4% from 45 to 64, and 31.2% who were 65 years of age or older.
 Figure 1. Population pyramid of village in 2002 – by age group and sex

See also
Kurozweki Palace

References

Villages in Staszów County